Notonomus phillipsii is a species of ground beetle in the subfamily Pterostichinae. It was described by Castelnau in 1867.

References

Notonomus
Beetles described in 1867